Rick Leach and David Macpherson were the defending champions but lost in the semifinals to Jan-Michael Gambill and Graydon Oliver.

Jeff Coetzee and Chris Haggard won in the final 7–6(7–4), 6–4 against Gambill and Oliver.

Seeds
The top five seeded teams received byes into the second round.

Draw

Final

Top half

Bottom half

External links
 2002 AIG Japan Open Tennis Championships Men's Doubles Draw

Doubles